Csenyéte is a village in Borsod-Abaúj-Zemplén county, Hungary. The village has an almost entirely Roma population. It is famous for being considered the poorest settlement in Hungary.

References

External links 
 Street map 

Populated places in Borsod-Abaúj-Zemplén County